Strumigenys lewisi, is one of more than 185 species in the genus Strumigenys. It is found in Philippines, Sri Lanka, Myanmar, Taiwan, Vietnam, China, North Korea, Japan, Malta, and South Korea. The ant is sometimes known as Japanese ant, due to its type specimen was found from Japan.

References

External links

 at antwiki.org
It is.org

Myrmicinae
Hymenoptera of Asia